Dundee  is a city in Yamhill County, Oregon, United States. The population was 3,238 at the 2020 census.

History
The first post office in the area was Ekins, established in 1881. Dundee is named in honor of the birthplace of William Reid, Dundee, Scotland. Reid came to Oregon in 1874 to establish the Oregonian Railway, and made several extensions to the railroad in the western Willamette Valley. The Ekins post office was closed in 1885 and a new office opened in 1887, named "Dundee Junction". The name derived from plans to build a bridge across the Willamette River for the railroad, which would have called for a junction at Dundee between the west railroad and the new east railroad. The bridge was never built, however, and the post office was renamed "Dundee" in 1897.

Geography

Dundee is two miles southwest of the city of Newberg.

Demographics

2010 census
As of the census of 2010, there were 3,162 people, 1,136 households, and 866 families living in the city. The racial makeup of the city was 91.2% White, 0.4% African American, 1.2% Native American, 1.4% Asian, 0.2% Pacific Islander, 3.1% from other races, and 2.6% from two or more races. Hispanic or Latino of any race were 10.4% of the population.

There were 1,136 households, of which 41.1% had children under the age of 18 living with them, 62.4% were married couples living together, 8.9% had a female householder with no husband present, 4.9% had a male householder with no wife present, and 23.8% were non-families. 19.3% of all households were made up of individuals, and 8% had someone living alone who was 65 years of age or older. The average household size was 2.78 and the average family size was 3.15.

The median age in the city was 36.7 years. 27.8% of residents were under the age of 18; 6.7% were between the ages of 18 and 24; 29.3% were from 25 to 44; 26.1% were from 45 to 64; and 10.2% were 65 years of age or older. The gender makeup of the city was 50.3% male and 49.7% female.

2000 census
As of the census of 2000, there were 2,598 people, 921 households, and 715 families living in the city. The population density was 1,915.5 people per square mile (737.6/km2). There were 952 housing units at an average density of 701.9 per square mile (270.3/km2). The racial makeup of the city was 92.73% White, 0.85% Native American, 1.00% Asian, 3.31% from other races, and 2.12% from two or more races. Hispanic or Latino of any race were 7.54% of the population.

There were 921 households, out of which 41.2% had children under the age of 18 living with them, 65.8% were married couples living together, 8.8% had a female householder with no husband present, and 22.3% were non-families. 17.8% of all households were made up of individuals, and 7.2% had someone living alone who was 65 years of age or older. The average household size was 2.82 and the average family size was 3.23.

In the city, the population was spread out, with 30.6% under the age of 18, 6.9% from 18 to 24, 32.6% from 25 to 44, 20.7% from 45 to 64, and 9.2% who were 65 years of age or older. The median age was 34 years. For every 100 females, there were 98.6 males. For every 100 females age 18 and over, there were 93.4 males.

The median income for a household in the city was $50,284, and the median income for a family was $56,429. Males had a median income of $41,005 versus $25,776 for females. The per capita income for the city was $20,455. About 5.7% of families and 6.6% of the population were below the poverty line, including 8.8% of those under age 18 and 5.0% of those age 65 or over.

Government
In 2005, the Dundee City Council voted to disband its police department and contract police services to the Newberg Police Department in nearby Newberg. The Newberg Police Department was then renamed the Newberg-Dundee Police Department.

See also
Ash Island

References

External links
 Entry for Dundee in the Oregon Blue Book

Cities in Oregon
Cities in Yamhill County, Oregon
Portland metropolitan area
1887 establishments in Oregon
Populated places established in 1887
Populated places on the Willamette River